Convoy SC 104 was the 104th of the numbered series of World War II Slow Convoys of merchant ships from Sydney, Cape Breton Island to Liverpool. During October 1942, a U-boat wolf pack sank eight ships from the convoy. The convoy escorts sank two of the attacking submarines.

Background
As western Atlantic coastal convoys brought an end to the second happy time, Admiral Karl Dönitz the Befehlshaber der U-Boote (BdU) or commander in chief of U-boats, shifted focus to the mid-Atlantic to avoid aircraft patrols. Although convoy routing was less predictable in the mid-ocean, Dönitz anticipated that the increased numbers of U-boats being produced would be able to effectively search for convoys with the advantage of intelligence gained through B-Dienst decryption of British Naval Cypher Number 3. However, only 20 percent of the 180 trans-Atlantic convoys sailing from the end of July 1942 until the end of April 1943 lost ships to U-boat attack.

Action
The convoy was found and reported by U-258 on 11 October, and the other Wotan boats were ordered to join. By the evening of 12 October, U-258 had been joined by U-221 and U-356, and during the night of 12/13 October these boats attacked. U-258 and U-356 were unsuccessful, being driven off by the escorts, but U-221 was able to sink three ships: the Norwegian freighters Senta, and  Fagersten, and the British freighter Ashworth.

On the 13th the three U-boats continued to shadow the convoy, and were joined during the day by five other boats. On the night of the 13/14 October the wolf pack attacked again. This time U-221 sank two ships: the American freighter Susana and the British whale factory ship Southern Empress. U-607 torpedoed the Greek freighter Nellie, which later sank, but was itself attacked and severely damaged, and was forced to return to France for repairs. U-661 torpedoed the Yugoslavian freighter Nikolina Matkovic, and U-618 torpedoed the Empire Mersey.

Throughout 15 October the Wotan boats shadowed SC 104, but were unable to mount any successful attacks that night. On 15 October, Viscount detected U-661 in fog, and attacked with gunfire, ramming and depth charges. U-661 was destroyed, but Viscount was also damaged, and had to finish the voyage as part of the convoy.

On 16 October U-353 was sighted by Fame, which attacked and destroyed her by ramming, again suffering damage in the process. Command of the escort passed to LtCdr C.A. Monsen in Potentilla, who was able to make an attack on a contact later that day. No identification was made, or result credited, but post-war examination shows that U-254 was severely damaged in this attack and forced to retire to base.

On 16 and 17 October SC 104 came in range of allied air patrols, long–range B-24 Liberators and Catalina flying boats. These were able to break up any further attacks and on the 17th, Dönitz ceased further operations against SC 104. The remainder of the voyage was unhindered, and the convoy reached Liverpool on 21 October. SC 104 lost 8 ships of 44,000 tons, with 2 escorts damaged, and saw the destruction of 2 U-boats with the damaging of 2 more.

Ships in convoy

Losses

See also
 Convoy Battles of World War II

Notes

References 
 Blair, Clay : Hitler's U-Boat War [Volume 2]: The Hunted 1942–1945 (1998)  (2000 UK paperback ed.)
 
 Kemp, Paul  : U-Boats Destroyed (1997).

External links
 http://www.convoyweb.org.uk/sc/index.html convoy.web
 http://uboat.net/ops/convoys/convoys.php?convoy=SC-104 u.boat.net

SC104
Naval battles of World War II involving Canada
C